Danderyd Municipality (Danderyds kommun) is a municipality north of Stockholm in Stockholm County in east central Sweden. It is one of the smallest municipalities of Sweden, but the most affluent. Its seat is located in Djursholm and it is located within Stockholm urban area.

The "old" rural municipality Danderyd was split up during the early 20th century, when Djursholm and Stocksund broke away in 1901 and 1910 respectively. Since 1971 Danderyd Municipality is reunified in approximately the old boundaries. The population in 2019 was 32,857. The four districts making up Danderyd are: Danderyd, Djursholm, Stocksund and Enebyberg.

Demographics

Income and Education
The population in Danderyd Municipality is among the most affluent in the country, having the highest median income per capita. One of the reasons for this is the high price on real estate, which in turn is partially due to a restrictive policy on new developments by the municipality council.

The high income of the population has enabled the municipality to maintain a relatively low rate of taxation, but a government redistribution scheme intended to transfer money from socioeconomically advantaged municipalities to those less well-off along with financial mismanagement has caused tax rises and expenditure reductions in recent years.

Danderyd Municipality also has the highest share (57.0%) of highly educated persons (Statistics Sweden definition: persons with post-secondary education that is three years or longer) in the country.

Residents with a foreign background 
On 31 December 2017 the number of people with a foreign background (persons born outside of Sweden or with two parents born outside of Sweden) was 6,402, or 19.47% of the population (32,888 on 31 December 2017). On 31 December 2002 the number of residents with a foreign background was (per the same definition) 4,512, or 15.16% (29,755 on 31 December 2002). On 31 December 2017 there were 32,888 residents in Danderyd, of which 5,394 people (16.40%) were born in a country other than Sweden, divided by country in the table below. Nordic countries as well as the 12 most common countries of birth outside of Sweden for Swedish residents have been included, with other countries of birth grouped together by continent by Statistics Sweden.

Roads
The European route E18 stretches through the municipality, from the road bridge over the Stocksundet sea strait, north towards Norrtälje Municipality.

Public transport
Danderyd is served by the Stockholm public transport system through SL. There are two stations on the Stockholm metro red line: Danderyd Hospital (which is the location for a public hospital) and Mörby centrum. There are also several stops on the narrow gauge Roslagsbanan suburban railway as well as an extensive bus network including a large bus interchange at Danderyds sjukhus.

Notable people
Ted Brithen (born 1990), ice hockey player
Mattias Janmark (born 1992), ice hockey player
Linda Ulvaeus (born 1973), singer
Hanna Stjärne (born 1969), CEO, Sveriges Television
Christian Lindberg (born 1958), musician and conductor
Princess Sofia, Duchess of Värmland (born 1984), former model and reality television contestant, wife of Prince Carl Philip, Duke of Värmland
Helge von Koch (born 1870), mathematician and pioneer in fractals
Irina Björklund (born 1973), Finnish actress, born in Danderyd
Tove Lo (born 1987) pop musician
Benjamin Ingrosso (born 1997) singer
Stig Wennerström (1906-2006) Air Force colonel and Soviet spy

See also
2002 Danderyd municipal election

References

External links

Danderyd Municipality - Official site

Municipalities of Stockholm County
Metropolitan Stockholm
Stockholm urban area
Municipal seats of Stockholm County
Swedish municipal seats
Populated places in Stockholm County